Langenberg is a borough (Stadtbezirk) of Velbert, a town in North Rhine-Westphalia, Germany. Its population is 15,717 (2021).  Located in this district is the famous Sender Langenberg transmission site, which transmits MW, FM, and TV broadcasting signals.

Gallery

References 

Towns in North Rhine-Westphalia